Minjavan District is in Khoda Afarin County, East Azerbaijan province, Iran. At the 2006 National Census, its population (as parts of the former Khoda Afarin District of Kaleybar County) was 12,993 in 2,948 households. The following census in 2011 counted 12,524 people in 3,388 households, by which time Khoda Afarin District had been elevated to the status of a county and divided into three districts. At the latest census in 2016, the district had 11,920 inhabitants in 3,864 households.

The online edition of the Dehkhoda Dictionary, quoting Iranian Army files, reports a population of 8,464 people in the late 1940s. At that time Janan Lu, Asheqlu, Dash Bashi, and Setan were the most important villages of the district. There are 22 villages which are no longer populated.

History
The only noteworthy allusion to the district in official records relates to an appeal by the inhabitants of the district to the interior minister of Iran, requesting protection from the abuses by Mohammad Khanlu family.'.

The district was formed in December 2010 by the approval of Iranian government.

References 

Khoda Afarin County

Districts of East Azerbaijan Province

Populated places in East Azerbaijan Province

Populated places in Khoda Afarin County